Operation Dingo was a major raid conducted by the Rhodesian Security Forces against the Zimbabwe African National Liberation Army (ZANLA) headquarters at Chimoio and a smaller camp at Tembue in Mozambique from 23 to 25 November 1977.

Background
Chimoio was a large ZANLA encampment and training facility, and a launchpad for insurgents infiltrating into Rhodesia. It was located at New Farm, known locally as Adriano's Farm. The old farmhouse, and a number of related monuments and graves, are located some 18 kilometres north-northeast of Chimoio Municipality.() The positions of the fallen are marked by at least twelve mass graves which are clustered around the main New Farm complex.

The Target
New Farm was a farm acquired by the Frelimo Government in 1975 from its Portuguese owner, known as 'Adriano'. It was leased to the ZANU/ZANLA organisation of Zimbabwe which made it their (then) forward, or main, operating headquarters for war against Rhodesia. New Farm was a political and military hub rolled into one and would have included some family members of the camp's military and political occupants. Writing in the Zimbabwe government-owned Sunday Mail Garikai Mazara mentioned the existence of 20 mass graves related to the battles of 2325 November 1977 and detailed the constituent parts of this camp. Namely:

 Adriano's farm house, or the 'White House'–Zanu Party HQ (residence of Josiah Tongogara and others of the general staff);
 Parirenyatwa camp hospital;
 Takawira Camp 1 for general military training;
 Takawira Camp 2 for engineering and anti-aircraft training (home to hard-core cadres trained in China, Yugoslavia and Tanzania);
 Chitepo College of Ideology, for political indoctrination, propaganda, etc.;
 Chindunduma camp–a general school;
 Mbuya Nehanda A–a female military training camp;
 Mbuya Nehanda B–a gynaecology and obstetrics clinic for female cadres;
 Pecy Ntini camp–a rehabilitation unit for disabled and wounded cadres;
 Chaminuka Camp–an internal security and intelligence unit doubling up as a prison;
 Zvede Zvevanhu camp–the military stores: ordnance, supply and vehicle pool, inclusive of Mudzingadzi piggery;
 Pasichigare Camp–a camp for the accommodation of 'in-house' ngangas, mediums, predictors of the future and traditional healers;
 Sekuru Kaguvi Camp–a care-home for pensioned cadres or their older relatives.

The Operation
At 0745 in the morning, directly after a strike by the Rhodesian Air Force's aging Canberra and Hunter strike aircraft, the camps were attacked. 96 Rhodesian SAS, 48 Rhodesian Light Infantry (RLI) paratroopers, and an additional 40 helicopter-borne RLI troops took part. The intent was to exploit the concentration of forces on the parade ground for morning parade. In order to strike as many ground targets as possible, six mothballed Vampire jets dating from the 1940s were brought back into use for the operation.

As part of a deception plan, a Douglas DC-8 airliner was flown over the Chimoio camps 10 minutes before the airstrike; the assembled ZANLA forces assumed a second false alarm, and did not disperse or try to take cover when the bombers subsequently approached.

Following the initial air strikes by the Canberras, Hunters and Vampire FB9's, ten Alouette III helicopter gunships ("K-Cars" in the attackers' terminology) engaged opportunity targets in allocated areas that together inflicted the majority of the casualties, while two Vampire T11's flew top cover. The paratroopers and heliborne troops were deployed on three sides of the objective into various stop groups and sweep lines, and were also effective in killing large numbers of fleeing ZANLA cadres. Nevertheless, the small size of the ground force and the lack of a complete envelopment allowed a number of fleeing ZANLA cadres to escape. Two important targets of the attack, ZANLA commanders Josiah Tongogara and Rex Nhongo escaped.

A "stay-behind" force of Rhodesian SAS remained in ambush positions around the area overnight, to wait for any ZANLA who might return; these SAS were then extracted by helicopter in the morning. The Rhodesian force withdrew, having lost one SAS member, Tpr. F.J. Nel, being shot and killed at Chimoio, and one Vampire pilot, Flt Lt Phillip Haigh, killed trying to crashland his jet in a field after his aircraft was damaged by ground fire. The pilot chose to attempt a forced landing rather than execute the dangerous act of bailing out of the Vampire which was not fitted with an ejection seat.
According to the Rhodesian government at least 1,200 ZANLA "terrorists" were killed in Operation Dingo. Most sources sympathetic to the ZANLA also put the death toll at over 1,000, adding that hundreds who were killed were actually civilians and not guerrillas.

Aftermath
A similar attack was repeated two days later at Tembue.. On that occasion, the morning parade had been cancelled, making the cluster bomb strike on the parade ground assembly ineffective. Though there was a Mozambique Liberation Front base nearby they did not interfere in the Rhodesian force's activities.

A new base was later built in the Chimoio area. The Rhodesians attacked it in 1978 under Operation Snoopy. Operation Dingo was to be followed by a further thirty cross-border raids before the end of the war.

See also
Operation Eland
Battle of Cassinga

References

Bibliography

1977 in Rhodesia
1977 in Mozambique
Dingo
Massacres in Mozambique
November 1977 events in Africa